Kohband District is situated in the northwestern part of Kapisa Province, Afghanistan. It borders Kohistan District to the west, Parvan Province to the north, Nijrab District to the east and Mahmud Raqi District to the south. The population is 26,133 (2019). The district center is Hajjikheyl located in the western part of the district. The people mostly speak Pashayi language.

Geography 
The Kohband district is located in a mountainous area of Kapisa province.

References

Districts of Kapisa Province